Pseudyrias is a genus of moths of the family Erebidae. The genus was erected by George Hampson in 1926.

Species
Pseudyrias arcadelti Schaus, 1933 Venezuela
Pseudyrias calligramma Hampson, 1926 Peru
Pseudyrias corvita (Schaus, 1901) Mexico
Pseudyrias dufayi Schaus, 1933 Jamaica
Pseudyrias eugrapha (Dognin, 1914) Ecuador
Pseudyrias farranti Schaus, 1933 Panama
Pseudyrias gallusi Scahus, 1933 Guatemala
Pseudyrias glycon (Schaus, 1914) French Guiana
Pseudyrias gomberti Schaus, 1933 Mexico
Pseudyrias grauni Schaus, 1933 Venezuela
Pseudyrias lineata (H. Druce, 1890) Guatemala, Panama
Pseudyrias melanchra Hampson, 1926 Peru
Pseudyrias merbecki Schaus, 1933 French Guiana
Pseudyrias olearos (Schaus, 1913) French Guiana
Pseudyrias perusta (Kaye, 1901) Trinidad
Pseudyrias purpureofusa Hampson, 1926 Brazil (Amazonas)
Pseudyrias tyei Schaus, 1933 Guyana, Tridinda
Pseudyrias villaerti Schaus, 1933 Guatemala
Pseudyrias watsoni Schaus, 1940 Puerto Rico

References

Calpinae